Frello  is a surname, may refer to:
 Jorge Luiz Frello Filho, better known for his stage name Jorginho, Brazil-born Italian international footballer with Italians ancestry 
 Otto Frello (1924–2015), Danish painter, graphic artist, cartoonist and illustrator